Aufhausen is a municipality in the district of Regensburg in Bavaria in Germany.

Aufhausen Priory is located in the village.

Notable people
Johann Georg Seidenbusch (1641–1729), priest, painter, and composer, founder of Aufhausen Priory

References

Regensburg (district)